Iraq–Spain relations are the bilateral and diplomatic relations between these two countries. Iraq has an embassy in Madrid. Spain has an embassy in Baghdad and an honorary consulate in Erbil.

History of diplomatic relations 
In 1946 diplomatic relations are established between Spain and the then Kingdom of Iraq and in 1948 the Spanish legation is opened in Baghdad, under the Spanish Embassy in Cairo. Spain raises the level of its representation in Iraq to the rank of Embassy in 1955. In 1952, the then Prince Regent Abd al-Ilah of Hejaz visits Spain, and the King of Iraq, Faisal II, would do so in 1956. The regime change in 1958 barely affected the bilateral relationship and the views of Spain of leading Iraqi political personalities were frequent during the next two decades.

The Kings of Spain visited Baghdad in 1978, in one of their first state visits to an Arab country. The active policy developed during the 50s and 60s of the last century by the Hispano-Arab Institute of Culture on scholarships allowed many Iraqi students to access Spanish universities to carry out higher studies, especially in language and literature, medicine and engineering. Spanish companies began arriving in Iraq in the late 1960s, where they became a benchmark, especially in civil construction and infrastructure. Iraq was an important client of the Spanish shipbuilding industry, and a growing volume of commercial exchange was maintained, with Spain being a major buyer of Iraqi crude.

During the 70s and first half of the 80s, Spain was one of the European countries of reference in Iraq, maintaining a direct flight of the Iraqi Airways flag company between Madrid and Baghdad several times a week. During the war between Iran and Iraq, (1980-1988), the intensity of the bilateral relationship decreased due to the position of Spanish neutrality in the face of the conflict.

The invasion of Kuwait in August 1990 led the United Nations to the adoption of resolutions 660 and 678 and the establishment of a coalition, in which Spain was located, in order to liberate Kuwait and thus restore international legality. In that operation Spain had a discreet naval and logistical support participation.

During the 90s, Spain was part of the "Oil for Food" program. After the closure for a few months of the Embassy of Spain in Baghdad
After the occupation of Kuwait and subsequent release, diplomatic relations between the two countries were reduced to the level of Business Manager. It was not until 2005 that Spain reappointed an Ambassador to Baghdad.

On March 19 of 2003 the intervention in Iraq of the troops of United States, United Kingdom, Australia and Poland causing the fall of the Baathist regime in 21 days, although operations officially ended on May 1. A first Spanish humanitarian contingent arrived in Iraq in April 2003. In July, the assignment assigned to the Spanish contingent becomes a “peace mission” and is framed in a multinational division under Polish command with the objective of guaranteeing order in the central-southern part of the country (Shiite) based in Diwaniyah and Kerbala

On October 15, 2003, the United Nations approved the resolution 1511, authorizing the presence of a multinational force in Iraq. On April 18 of 2004, the Government of Spain orders the withdrawal of troops that is completed at the end of June 2004. The current Iraqi authorities have always expressed their gratitude to Spain for the role played in supporting the operation that caused the fall of the Baathist dictatorship, as well as the significant economic effort made in aid for the reconstruction of Iraq in accordance with the commitments made at the Donors Conference in Madrid, primarily through IRFFI, (International Reconstruction Fund Facility for Iraq).

In September 2013, the Xth HispanoIraquí Mixed Commission was held in Madrid, the first since the 2003 invasion. This will help to strengthen bilateral relations in the coming years, recovering the level of two friendly countries with important historical ties and common interests. .

In February 2015, the Minister of Defense Pedro Morenés visited the Spanish troops deployed in Baghdad and at the base of Besmaya, south of the capital. In addition, he held a meeting with General Zebari, Chief of Defense Staff.

Cooperation 
At the Donors Conference held in Madrid in October 2003, Spain committed $300 million, including donations and soft loans to
the period 2003–2007, corresponding to 160 million to the period 2003–2004, of which 55 would go to the IRFFI (International Reconstruction Fund Facility for Iraq) window World Bank, 170 million in bilateral non-refundable aid and 75 million in soft loans.

Maintaining the commitment acquired at the Donor Conference, and in order to make Spain's cooperation effort more effective with Iraq, in 2006 the distribution of non-reimbursable aid was modified, giving priority to the “United Nations window” in IRFFI .

See also  
 Foreign relations of Iraq 
 Foreign relations of Spain

References 

 
Spain
Iraq